This page is part of the List of years in poetry.  The List of years in poetry and List of years in literature provide snapshots of developments in poetry and literature worldwide in a given year, decade or century, and allow easy access to a wide range of Wikipedia articles about movements, writers, works and developments in any timeframe. Please help to build these lists by adding and updating entries as you use them. You can access pages for individual years within the century through the navigational template at the bottom of this page, and you can access pages for other centuries through the navigational template to the right. To access the poetry pages by way of a single chart, please see the Centuries in poetry page or the List of years in poetry page.

Years link to the corresponding "[year] in poetry" articles.

Arabic and Persian World

Events
 Golden age of Jewish culture in the Iberian Peninsula
 While imprisoned in Constantinople, from November 962 (or earlier) to 966, Abu Firas al-Hamdani writes some of his finest poetry, the collection known as al-Rūmiyyāt

Poets
 Rabi'a Balkhi (10th century)
 Asjadi (10th/11th century)
 Farrukhi Sistani (10th/11th century)
 Kisai Marvazi (10th century)
 Ayyuqi (10th century)
 Lubna of Cordoba (10th century)

Births of Arabic-world poets
Abu-Shakur Balkhi (915– )
Abu Firas al-Hamdani (c.932–968)
Al-Mutanabbi (915–965)
Ferdowsi (فردوسی), poet (935–1020)
Abu Mansur Daqiqi (935/942–976/980)
Badi' al-Zaman al-Hamadhani (967–1007)
Abu ibn Abd Allah al-Ma'arri (973–1057)
Samuel ibn Naghrillah (993–after 1056)
Wallada bint al-Mustakfi (994–1091)

Deaths of Arabic-world poets
Abdullah ibn al-Mu'tazz (861–908)
Ibn Duraid (837–934)
 Mansur al-Hallaj (died 922)
Al-Sanawbari (died 945)
Al-Mutanabbi (915–965)
Abu al-Faraj al-Isfahani (897–967)
Muhammad bin Hani al Andalusi al Azdi, (died 973)
 Abu Mansur Daqiqi (935/942–976/980)

Works
Publication of the Kitab al-Aghani or Book of Songs collecting important 9th century Arabic poetry and songs.
Abu-Shakur Balkhi, Āfarin nama (944)

Celtic and Germanic Europe

Events
 "Age of the Sagays" - most of the events described in the Norse and Icelandic Sagas date to the period from 930 to 1030 CE.
 The Rhyming Poem, included in the Exeter Book, is the first record of rhyming in English poetry.

Poets
 Deor, a scop, writes his Lament
 10th century Norse and Icelandic skalds for which exact dates are unavailable: 
 Eilífr Goðrúnarson, author of Þórsdrápa 
 Einarr Helgason
 Eysteinn Valdason
 Eyvindr skáldaspillir, author of Hákonarmál and Háleygjatal
 Guthormr sindri,  author of Hákonardrápa
 Egill Skalla-Grímsson (c. 910 – c. 990)
 Kormákur Ögmundarson (Fl. 10th century)
 Þórarinn Þórólfsson (Fl. 10th century), author of Þórarinn svarti or Þórarinn Máhlíðingur
 Einar skálaglamm (Fl. 10th century), author of Einar Helgason
 Hallfreður vandræðaskáld (Fl. 10th – 11th centuries), author of Hallfreður Óttarsson

Works
 The Battle of Maldon, perhaps written soon after the event of 991 it describes
 Exeter Book, a collection of Old English literature
 Eiríksmál (c. 954)

Latin Europe

Poets
 Israel the Grammarian (c. 895–c. 965)

Byzantine Empire and Slavic Europe
 Acritic songs in the Byzantine Empire
 Compilation of the ultimate edition of the Greek Anthology

India

Poets
 Andal flourishes, writing in Tamil
 Nagavarma I writes in Kannada
 Sri Ponna writes in Kannada
 Shivakotiacharya writes in Kannada (approx. - may be earlier)

China

Poets
 Wang Yucheng (954–1001)

Japan

Works
Imperial waka anthologies: 
 Kokin Wakashū the first imperial waka anthology, 20 scrolls, 1,111 poems, ordered by Emperor Daigo and completed c. 905, compiled by Ki no Tsurayuki, Ki no Tomonori, Ōshikōchi and Mibu no Tadamine
 Gosen Wakashū 20 scrolls, 1,426 poems, ordered in 951 by Emperor Murakami

Poets
 Akazome Emon 赤染衛門 (956–1041) waka poet of the mid-Heian period; a member of both the Thirty-six Elder Poetic Sages and Kintō's 36 female poetry immortals (or "sages") of the Kamakura period
Fujiwara no Asatada 藤原朝忠 also 中納言朝忠 (911–966), middle Heian period waka poet and nobleman; one of the Thirty-six Poetry Immortals; one of his poems is in the Hyakunin Isshu anthology
Fujiwara no Kintō 藤原公任, also known as "Shijō-dainagon" (966–1041), poet and critic; one of the Thirty-six Poetry Immortals; has poems in anthologies including the Shūi Wakashū, the Wakan rōeishū, and Shūi Wakashū
Fujiwara no Masatada 藤原雅正 (died 961), poet with family connections to several other poets: first son of Fujiwara no Kanesuke; grandfather of Murasaki Shikibu ("Lady Murasaki"); older brother of Fujiwara no Kiyotada; married a daughter of Fujiwara no Sadakata; father of Fujiwara no Tametoki; also acquainted with Ki no Tsurayuki
Fujiwara no Nagayoshi 藤原長能, also known as "Fujiwara no Nagatō" (949 – death year unknown), poet and a court bureaucrat of the Heian period; one of the "Thirty-six Poetry Immortals"; taught waka to the poet Nōin
Fujiwara no Takamitsu 藤原高光 (c. 939–994), middle Heian period waka poet and  nobleman; one of the Thirty-six Poetry Immortals; has poems in imperial poetry anthologies starting with Gosen Wakashū
Fujiwara no Tametoki 藤原為時 (died 1029?), poet, minor official and governor of various provinces, scholar of Chinese literature and the father of Murasaki Shikibu ("Lady Murasaki")
Fujiwara no Toshiyuki  藤原敏行, also "Fujiwara Toshiyuki no Ason" 藤原敏行朝亜 (birthdate unknown, died in 901 or 907), middle Heian period waka poet and  nobleman; one of the Thirty-six Poetry Immortals; has a poem in the anthology Hyakunin Isshu and poems in several imperial poetry anthologies, including Kokin Wakashū and Gosen Wakashū
Izumi Shikibu 和泉式部  nicknamed "The Floating Lady" 浮かれ女 for her series of passionate affairs (born c. 976 – year of death unknown, sometime after 1033), mid-Heian period poet, novelist and noblewoman; one of the Thirty-six Poetry Immortals; known for a sequence of affairs at the court in the capital; close friend of Akazome Emon, rival of Lady Murasaki, and mother of poet Koshikibu no Naishi; poetry praised by Fujiwara no Kinto
Ki no Tomonori 紀友則 (c. 850 – c. 904), early Heian period waka poet of the court, one of the Thirty-six Poetry Immortals; one of the four compilers of the Kokin Wakashū anthology
Ki no Tsurayuki 紀貫之 (872–945)  Heian period waka poet, government official and courtier; son of Ki no Mochiyuki; one of four compilers of the Kokin Wakashū anthology; provincial governor of Tosa province (930–935) and later possibly governor of Suo province
Kishi Joō 徽子女王, also Yoshiko Joō 承香殿女御 Jokyōden Joō or 斎宮女御 Saigū no Nyōgo (929–985), middle Heian period Waka poet
 Kiyohara no Motosuke, 清原元輔 (908–990), one of the Five Men of the Pear Chamber
Mibu no Tadamine 壬生忠岑 (active 898–920), Japanese early Heian period waka poet of the court; one of the Thirty-six Poetry Immortals; father of Mibu no Tadami
Minamoto no Kintada 源公忠, also 源公忠朝臣 (889–948), middle Heian period waka poet and nobleman; one of the Thirty-six Poetry Immortals, along with his son Minamoto no Saneakira; an official in the imperial treasury; has poems in imperial poetry anthologies, starting with the Goshūi Wakashū
Minamoto no Muneyuki 源宗于, also Minamoto no Muneyuki Ason 源宗于朝臣 (died 983), early Heian period waka poet and nobleman; one of the Thirty-six Poetry Immortals;  has a poem in the Hyakunin Isshu anthology
Minamoto no Saneakira 源信明 (910–970), middle Heian period waka poet and nobleman; he and his father, Minamoto no Kintada, are two of the Thirty-six Poetry Immortals; his poems are in imperial poetry anthologies from the Goshūi Wakashū onward
Minamoto no Shigeyuki 源重之 (died 1000), early Heian period waka poet and nobleman; one of the Thirty-six Poetry Immortals; has a poem in the Hyakunin Isshu anthology
 Minamoto no Shitagō 源順 (911–983), waka poet, scholar and nobleman; one of the Five Men of the Pear Chamber and Thirty-six Poetry Immortals; author of the Minamoto no Shitagōshū poetry collection; some scholars claim that he also wrote the Taketori Monogatari; original compiler of the Wamyō Ruijushō, the first extant Japanese dictionary organized into semantic headings
Nakatsukasa 中務 (912–991), middle Heian period Waka poet
Nōin 能因, lay name: Tachibana no Nagayasu 橘永愷 (988 – c. 1051),   late Heian period poet and monk; one of the "Thirty-six Medieval Poetry Immortals"
Ono no Komachi 小野 小町 or おののこまち (c. 825 – c. 900), early Heian period waka poet, one of the Rokkasen — the Six best Waka poets; one of the Thirty-six Poetry Immortals; noted as a rare beauty and became a symbol of a beautiful woman in Japan
Ōnakatomi no Yorimoto 大中臣頼基 (c. 886–958), middle Heian period waka poet and nobleman; one of the Thirty-six Poetry Immortals
 Sei Shōnagon 清少納言  (c. 966–1017),  middle Heian Period author, poet and court lady who served Empress Teishi/Empress Sadako; best known as the author of The Pillow Book
 Shirome (fl. 10th century), minor waka poet and common prostitute (a woman)
 Sugawara no Michizane 菅原道真, also known as "Kan Shōjō" 菅丞相, (845–903), Heian Period scholar, poet and politician; grandson of Sugawara no Kiyotomo; also wrote Chinese poetry

Decades and years

 01
Poetry by century
Medieval poetry
Poetry